

HD 9446 c is an exoplanet discovered in 2010 orbiting the star HD 9446 in the constellation Triangulum, 50 parsecs from Earth.

See also 
 HD 9446 b

References 

Exoplanets discovered in 2010
Exoplanets detected by radial velocity
Triangulum (constellation)
Giant planets